The NPE Extension Expressway (BEE) is an expressway in Kuala Lumpur, Malaysia connecting Kuchai Lama interchange on the New Pantai Expressway to the Kuala Lumpur–Seremban Expressway.

List of interchange

References

Expressways and highways in the Klang Valley
Expressways in Malaysia
Malaysian Expressway System